Nílton Coelho da Costa, best known as Bodinho, (June 16, 1928 in Recife – September 22, 2007 in Porto Alegre) was a Brazilian football player.
With Larry Pinto de Faria formed most invaluable double striker attack of Internacional. He started career for Internacional in 1951.

Clubs
 Íbis: 1943
 Sampaio Corrêa: 1944
 Flamengo: 1945–1949
 Nacional (RS): 1950–1951
 Internacional: 1951–1958

Honours
 Campeonato Gaúcho: five times (1950, 1951, 1952, 1953, and 1955).
 Panamerican Championship: 1956, with Brazil national football team.

External links
 

1928 births
Brazilian footballers
Association football forwards
Sport Club Internacional players
CR Flamengo footballers
Fluminense FC players
Sampaio Corrêa Futebol Clube players
Brazil international footballers
2007 deaths
Sportspeople from Recife